Clarence Robert Beck (March 13, 1896 – August 20, 1962) was a professional football player from Harrisburg, Pennsylvania. Beck attended high school at Harrisburg Tech where he scored a 105-yard touchdown for Tech against their rival Steelton. After high school, Beck attended Pennsylvania State University where he became a star offensive tackle. Beck made his professional debut in the National Football League in 1925 with the Pottsville Maroons. He played in the NFL for one season. Prior to that, he played for the independent Union Quakers of Philadelphia in 1921.

In 1924 Beck helped the Maroons win the 1924 Anthracite League championship. This move placed Clarence with his brother, Carl, on the Maroons team. In 1925 the Maroons entered the NFL. That year Clarence played on the Maroons team that won the 1925 NFL Championship, before it was stripped from the team due to a disputed rules violation.

Notes

Players of American football from Pennsylvania
Penn State Nittany Lions football players
Pottsville Maroons players
Pottsville Maroons (Anthracite League) players
Union Quakers of Philadelphia players
1890s births
1962 deaths